The Central American Handball Championship is the official competition for Men's and Women's national handball teams of Central America. In addition to crowning the Central American champions, the tournament also serves as a qualifying tournament for the Pan American Handball Championship.

Men

Summary

Medal table

Participating nations

Women

Summary

Medal table

Participating nations

References

External links
 www.panamhandball.org
 handballsca.org

 
Handball competitions in North America